Super Hearer is a South Korean music reality show program on tvN.

Season 1 of the show aired on tvN starting from June 16, 2019 to August 4, 2019 on Sundays at 22:40 (KST).

Synopsis 
This is a music reality show program where it features a panel of 5 "Hearers" and a panel of 5 "Villains". In each episode, there will be a featured theme. The Hearers' job is to listen to the different singing voices and find the correct contestant(s) that fits the theme. On the other hand, the Villains' job is to interfere the Hearers by making them confused which in turn preventing them from getting the right answers. If the Hearers won, the prize money will be given to them, if not the prize money will be given to the 5 contestants.

Gameplay
Round 1 is to listen to all 5 contestants sing 1 song, and then in the next part, each of the 5 contestants sing for 30 seconds. The Hearers would come together to choose only 1 contestant who they believe to fit the theme. If succeeded, the Hearers win ₩1,000,000 from this round.

Round 2 is to listen to each of the remaining 4 contestants sing a part of a song or a small medley, and their real identities are shown to only the Villains and the audience. The Hearers will have to eventually decide on the contestant(s) out of the remaining 4 who they believe to fit the theme. If the Hearers chose the correct contestant(s), they will get ₩2,000,000.

Cast

Host
 Jang Sung-kyu

Hearers

Villains

List of Episodes 
Contestants' names in bold are the contestants who fulfill the theme.

  – Succeeded in guessing correctly.
  – Failed to guess correctly.

Ratings 
 Ratings listed below are the individual corner ratings of Super Hearer. (Note: Individual corner ratings do not include commercial time, which regular ratings include.)

Notes

References

External links 
 Official Website

Music competitions in South Korea
South Korean music television shows
TVN (South Korean TV channel) original programming
2019 South Korean television series debuts
Korean-language television shows